Jamiat Ulema-e-Islam Pakistan (Fazl) also Jamiat Ulema-e-Islam (F) or simply as Jamiat Ulema-e-Islam (JUI-F) is a Deobandi Sunni political party in Pakistan. Established as the Jamiat Ulema-e-Islam in 1945, it is the result of a factional split in 1988, F standing for the name of its leader, Fazal-ur-Rehman.

It is almost entirely based in southern Khyber Pakhtunkhwa and northern Balochistan, which are mostly inhabited by Pashtuns. The JUI-S faction, led by Samiul Haq, is of regional significance in Khyber Pakhtunkhwa but has no representation on the national level. The split of JUI into two factions was due to dissent over the policy of Pakistani president Zia-ul-Haq of supporting Mujahideen outfits in the Afghanistan war during the 1980s. One of its faction, Jamiat Ulama-e-Islam Nazryati (JUI-N), split in 2007 and merged back into JUI-F in 2016. On 29 December 2020, Jamiat Ulema-e-Islam Pakistan (JUI-P) split as a separate political party under the leadership of Muhammad Khan Sherani.

History

Formation
The JUI follows the Deobandi school of Sunni Islam. In Pakistan, Deobandis have a presence in Khyber Pakhtunkhwa (KP), Sindh, and Balochistan. The JUI traces its roots to politically active Deobandi who formed the Jamiat Ulema-e-Hind (JUH) in 1919 in British India. The JUH was against colonialism and for a united India, opposing the formation of a separate homeland for Indian Muslims. A faction supporting the creation of Pakistan parted ways in 1945 to support the All Indian Muslim League. This faction came to be known as the Jamiat Ulema-e-Islam Pakistan (JUI).

United JUI
JUI's first president, Shabbir Ahmad Usmani, broke away from the party in 1947 to form the Markazi Jamiat Ulema-e-Islam (MJUI), which played a key position in the passage of the Objectives Resolution of 1949 that laid down the "Islamic" foundations of future constitutions in Pakistan. The JUI became more politically active under Maulana Mufti Mahmood (1919–1980), who assumed its leadership in 1962. Under Mahmood during the 1960s the party "developed a strong presence" and base of support among the "intensely conservative countryside" of Balochistan and Khyber Pakhtunkhwa. Mahmood led the JUI against Ayub Khan's modernization policies.

The JUI also participated in the 1970 elections with the Islamist Jamaat-e-Islami Pakistan party and the Barelvi Sunni religious party Jamiat Ulema-e-Pakistan (JUP). It won seven seats in the National Assembly and nine in the provincial assemblies and became a partner in the NWFP and Balochistan provincial governments. Mufti Mahmood was sworn in as NWFP chief minister. Under him, the provincial government established a board to bring all laws in conformity with Islam. He resigned in 1973 over Bhutto’s dismissal of the Balochistan provincial government.

Split into JUI-F and JUI-S
During the 1980s, the JUI supported some of General Zia ul Haq's policies, including his anti-Soviet Jihad in Afghanistan. Additionally, official patronage and financial support for madrassas during the Zia years allowed the JUI to build thousands of madrassas, especially in the NWFP (now KPK), which were instrumental in the formation of the Taliban. At the same time the JUI was distrustful of Zia's close ties with the Jamaat-e-Islami and joined the anti-Zia and PPP-led Movement for the Restoration of Democracy (MRD).

Following the death of Mufti Mehmood Ahmed in 1980s, This dual relationship with Zia's regime eventually led to a split in the party which came to be divided into the JUI-F, headed by Maulana Fazal-ur-Rehman and the JUI-S headed by Samiul Haq, who supported Zia and was a member in his parliament, the Majlis-e-Shura.

JUI-F renamed to JUI 
However, after the assassination of JUI-S chief Samiul Haq in 2018, the activities of his faction gradually died down. This lead Moulana Fazal-ur-Rehman to successfully plead before Election Commission of Pakistan (ECP) to get his JUI-F faction renamed as JUI in March 2019.

Madrassas
Over the years the JUI-S has maintained that it is more committed to enforcing Sharia in the country than the JUI-F faction. JUI-S influence is largely restricted to a few districts of Khyber Pakhtunkhwa (KPK), whereas the JUI-F is predominant in the Pashtun areas of Balochistan and KPK.

Both factions of the JUI have a large network of madrassas and mosques that provide the main basis for its religious activism and politics. The two JUIs run over 65 percent of all madrassas in Pakistan. About 30,000 Afghan students from JUI-controlled madrassas (both JUI-F and JUI-S) in Pakistan joined the Taliban movement in Afghanistan.

JUI party workers and leaders are mostly products of the madrassa system, although the JUI-F has often fielded candidates from a mainstream educational background. Both JUI factions have backed other India-oriented Deobandi militant groups, particularly the Harkat-ul-Mujahideen and its offshoot, the Jaish-e-Mohammad, with JUI madrassas providing recruits for them. They are closely associated with the Taliban in Afghanistan. The Taliban movement was reportedly started by graduates of JUI seminaries. Samiul Haq (of the JUI-S) is the leader of the Darul Uloom Haqqania madrassa in Akora Khattak, from where many of the top leaders of Taliban commanders and leaders graduated. In contrast to Maulana Samiul Haq and his JUI-S openly supporting militarism, the JUI-F has a policy of not supporting militant activity and of promoting multi-party electoral politics.

Peace deals
The JUI-F has also played a role in brokering peace deals between the military and militants in Pakistan's tribal belt. For instance, in 2004, two JUI-F national parliamentarians from South Waziristan arranged a deal (known as the Shakai agreement) with the Pakistani Taliban leadership and in September 2006 the JUI-F helped broker a similar deal in North Waziristan. These deals have been criticized for legitimizing "the status of the local militants as power-brokers". JUI-F leader Fazlur Rahman is also reportedly involved in negotiating agreements between the Pakistani Taliban and military and the Afghan Taliban and the US. On the political front, the JUI-F has been more successful than the JUI-S. Fazlur Rahman, leader of the JUI-F, was appointed as Chairman of the parliamentary committee on foreign affairs in the second government of Prime Minister Benazir Bhutto (1993–96).

History since 2002
The JUI-F was also the largest party in the MMA, winning 41 seats in the National Assembly and 29 of the MMA's 48 seats in NWFP in the 2002 elections. Subsequently, Fazlur Rahman became the Leader of the Opposition in 2004 and retained the post till 2007. The JUI-F was also part of the current ruling PPP coalition but left the government amidst charges of corruption against one of its members, and information technology minister of the federal cabinet. In return for JUI-F support, the PPP-led government-appointed Maulana Sherani, a JUI-F senator without any formal academic training in Islamic jurisprudence, as chairman of the Council of Islamic Ideology in 2010. Sherani has frequently spoken out against the government’s legislative efforts, particularly those related to women. He opposed a proposed bill on domestic violence stating that domestic violence was not a major issue in Pakistan until women's rights groups appeared and "created" it and that any such legislation hinders the creation of a "true Islamic society". Even though the JUI-F no longer remained a coalition partner of PPP, Fazlur Rahman chaired the Kashmir committee during the PPP government and even held the position till the end of PML-N's government in 2018.

Both factions of the JUI have frequently come together on a common platform to oppose American drone strikes in Pakistan's tribal areas, viewing it as a violation of Pakistan's sovereignty. For example, following the 2 May 2011 U.S. raid in Abbottabad that led to Osama Bin Laden's killing, the JUI-F, and the JUI-S participated in a multi-party conference in Peshawar, condemning the drone strikes and calling on the government to end logistical support to NATO troops in Afghanistan.

On the domestic front, members of the JUI-F have been vocal critics of changes in the blasphemy laws. Fazlur Rahman remained silent until his party left the ruling coalition in December 2010, after which he criticized proposals to amend the blasphemy law. The JUI-F has also opposed the passage of a bill aimed at preventing domestic violence with its members vowing to fight it "tooth and nail" as, according to them, its passage would "promote Western culture in the Islamic state."

In 2008, a further (minor) split of JUI-F resulted in the formation of a third faction, known as JUI-N ("N" for Nazryati "Ideological").

2020 Karak temple attack

In 2020, a mob of local Muslims led by a local Islamic cleric and supporters of the Jamiat Ulema-e-Islam party attacked the historic Hindu temple in the Karak district. Twelve people were arrested in the aftermath. More FIRs were registered against over 350 people. Following this attack the "Protection of the Rights of Religious Minorities Bill" was introduced in the Senate of Pakistan to avoid similar attack on minority worship places. But the Senate Standing Committee headed by Jamiat Ulema-e-Islam (F) (JUI-F) senator Abdul Ghafoor Haideri turned down the bill saying existing laws were enough to protect minorities.

Electoral history

National Assembly elections

See also 
 List of Deobandi organisations

References

Publications

External links
 

 
Jamiat Ulema-e-Islam
1988 establishments in Pakistan
Islamic political parties in Pakistan
Far-right political parties in Pakistan
Political parties established in 1988
Muttahida Majlis-e-Amal
Deobandi organisations

fr:Jamiat Ulema-e-Islam